Phyay Rei  (born 9 January 1976) is a Burmese politician who currently serves as a House of Nationalities member of parliament for Kayah State № 1 constituency.

Early life and education
He was born on 9 January 1976 in Loikaw, Kayah State, Burma (Myanmar). He graduated with G.T.I. (Civil) from Technological University, Loikaw and B.A. (History) from Loikaw University.

Political career
He is a member of the National League for Democracy. In the Myanmar general election, 2015, he was elected as an Amyotha Hluttaw MP, winning a majority of 15763 votes and elected representative from Kayah State № 1 parliamentary constituency. He also serves as a member of Amyotha Hluttaw Government’s Guarantees, Pledges and Undertakings Vetting Committee.

References

National League for Democracy politicians
1976 births
Living people
People from Kayah State